IAI-HAL NRUAV (Naval Rotary Unmanned Aerial Vehicle) is a rotorcraft project being co-developed by Malat Solutions, a unit of IAI of Israel, and HAL of India for the Indian Navy.

Design
The IAI-HALNRUAV project consists of a Malat-made Helicopter Modification Suite (HeMoS) fitted on HAL's Chetan, an upgraded Chetak with Turbomeca TM 333 2M2 engines. The helicopter is planned to be used for unmanned operations and advanced intelligence, surveillance and reconnaissance (ISR) missions from warship decks.

IAI-HAL NRUAV will feature automatic vertical Take-off and Landing (AVTOL) from aviation-capable ships and from unprepared landing sites.
It is intended to be employed as an elevated mast, which will extend the vessel's coverage over a much larger area, providing early warning and detection of aircraft, cruise missiles, surface vessels and even subsurface activities.
It is planned to have an endurance of 6 hours and up to a distance of 120 km from the launching vessel. The system is being designed to carry a variety of ISR payloads including SAR, EO, and SIGINT. The project is funded by the Indian Ministry of defense 

In October 2010, it was reported that the programme is plagued by the lack of a correct landing and take-off system for moving platforms such as the decks of warships and had run into serious delays.

As of March 2019, a full-scale prototype has been developed and unveiled, and is currently awaiting clearance for a preliminary design review.

Specifications

References

External links
IAI UAV - Defence Update
HAL Tejas - Latest Updates
Chetak UAV - Livefist

Unmanned military aircraft of India
Military equipment of India
Rustom
Proposed aircraft of India
Unmanned military aircraft of Israel
Unmanned helicopters
HAL aircraft